The 12210 / 09 Kathgodam Kanpur Central Garib Rath Express is a Superfast Express train of the Garib Rath series belonging to Indian Railways - Northern Railway zone that runs between Kathgodam and Kanpur Central in India.

It operates as train number 12210 from Kathgodam to Kanpur Central and as train number 12209 in the reverse direction serving the states of Uttarakhand & Uttar Pradesh.

Coaches
The 12210 / 09 Kathgodam Kanpur Central Garib Rath Express has 13 AC 3 tier & 2 EOG Coaches. It does not carry a Pantry car coach.

As is customary with most train services in India, Coach Composition may be amended at the discretion of Indian Railways depending on demand.

Service

Despite the average speed of the train being below , as per Indian Railways rules, its fare includes a Superfast surcharge.

Routing
The 12210 / 09 Kathgodam Kanpur Central Garib Rath Express runs from Kathgodam via Haldwani, Baheri, Izzatnagar, Bareilly, Shahjehanpur, Lucknow NE to Kanpur Central.

It reverses direction of travel during its journey at Lucknow NE.

Traction

As large sections of the route are yet to be fully electrified, a Ludhiana based WDM 3A or WDP-4D locomotive powers the train for its entire journey.

Rake Sharing

The 12210 / 09 Kathgodam Kanpur Central Garib Rath Express shares its rake with 12208 / 07 Jammu Tawi Kathgodam Garib Rath Express as follows:

12208 Jammu Tawi Kathgodam Garib Rath Express leaves Jammu Tawi on Sunday arriving Kathgodam on Monday then

12210 Kathgodam Kanpur Central Garib Rath Express leaves Kathgodam on Monday arriving Kanpur Central on Tuesday then

12209 Kanpur Central Kathgodam Garib Rath Express leaves Kanpur Central on Tuesday arriving Kathgodam the same day then

12207 Kathgodam Jammu Tawi Garib Rath Express''' leaves Kathgodam on Tuesday arriving back at Jammu Tawi on Wednesday.

Operation

12210 Kathgodam Kanpur Central Garib Rath Express leaves Kathgodam on Monday arriving Kanpur Central on Tuesday.

12209 Kanpur Central Kathgodam Garib Rath Express leaves Kanpur Central on Tuesday arriving Kathgodam the same day.

References

External links

Trains from Kanpur
Transport in Haldwani-Kathgodam
Garib Rath Express trains
Rail transport in Uttarakhand